David Kingsley Malcolm, AC, QC (6 May 1938 – 20 October 2014) was the Chief Justice of Western Australia from May 1988 until his retirement from the bench in February 2006. He was also an expatriate justice of the Supreme Court of Fiji.

Born in Bunbury, Western Australia, Malcolm was educated at Guildford Grammar School in Perth and was awarded a Rhodes Scholarship in 1960. Malcolm was a graduate of the University of Western Australia. He studied for his BCL at Wadham College, Oxford. Before serving as Chief Justice, Malcolm was a deputy counsel for the Asian Development Bank and one of Western Australia's most prominent Queen's Counsel. He regularly appeared before the Privy Council, and appeared as counsel on one of the last Australian appeals to the Privy Council before the Australia Act 1986 took effect. He was appointed Chief Justice of the Supreme Court on the retirement of the widely respected Francis Burt. In 1990 he also became Lieutenant-Governor of the state.

Malcolm earned great respect during his time as Chief Justice, and received great acclaim from the legal profession on his retirement on 7 February 2006. However, during his final year on the bench he came under increasing pressure, by the media, for perceived failings on the bench after he aborted a murder trial.

At his farewell, the Attorney-General, Jim McGinty, commented on the landmark judgement that Malcolm had handed down in the appeal of John Button, a high-profile case in which a manslaughter conviction was quashed over 30 years after the event. Wayne Martin replaced Malcolm as Chief Justice, and Malcolm later became Professor of Law at the University of Notre Dame Australia, Fremantle.

Malcolm died in Perth in October 2014, aged 76. The David Malcolm Justice Centre, a 33-storey skyscraper located on Cathedral Square in the Perth CBD, was named in his honour in 2016. The tower houses the civil arm of the Supreme Court and offices for the Department of the Attorney General and Department of Treasury.

References
 Taylor, Alister (ed)  (1997) The Australian roll of honour : national honours & awards 1975–1996  Sydney, N.S.W. : Roll of Honour Publications,  – item on Malcolm's AC 1992 for service to the law and to the Crown.

References

1938 births
2014 deaths
Australian Rhodes Scholars
Companions of the Order of Australia
People from Bunbury, Western Australia
People educated at Guildford Grammar School
Alumni of Wadham College, Oxford
Chief Justices of Western Australia
Judges of the Supreme Court of Western Australia
20th-century King's Counsel
Australian King's Counsel
Australian judges on the courts of Fiji
Supreme Court of Fiji justices
University of Western Australia alumni